John J. Brennan (born 1954), also known as Jack Brennan, served as Chairman of The Vanguard Group from 1996 to 2009, and was Vanguard CEO from 1996 until he was succeeded by William McNabb in 2008.

Career 
Brennan joined Vanguard in 1982. For many years he served as the company's president alongside John C. Bogle who was Vanguard's founder and CEO. When Bogle stepped down from his chairmanship in 1996, Brennan was his hand-picked successor.

He also was chairman of the Investment Company Institute, a trade organization representing mutual fund companies. He has chaired the Board of Trustees of the University of Notre Dame.  He was an independent director of General Electric and was also the chairman of FINRA (Financial Industry Regulatory Authority).

Personal life 
Brennan grew up in Winchester, Massachusetts, and attended Dartmouth College where he was a member of Sigma Nu fraternity.  Brennan's father, Frank Brennan, was chief executive at Union Warren Savings Bank in Boston.

References

External links

American financial businesspeople
Dartmouth College alumni
Harvard Business School alumni
American chief executives of financial services companies
The Vanguard Group
Living people
1954 births
University of Notre Dame Trustees